CyberLink PowerDVD is a universal media player for movie discs, video files, photos and music. During 2016, PowerDVD achieved certification from the Blu-ray Disc Association (BDA) for the playback of Ultra HD Blu-ray Discs, and became the world's first and only software player to pass the BD-ROM 4.0 PC Application Software License process.

Features
 8K video playback: added in PowerDVD 19
 Ultra HD Blu-Ray disc playback: PowerDVD 17 is the first software that supports 4K UHD Blu-ray drives.
 360-Degree VR: PowerDVD 17 supports 360-degree camera such as Samsung Gear 360 and the Nikon KeyMission. Available to watch VR content on an Oculus Rift or HTC Vive headset.
 Blu-Ray 3D disc playback: added in PowerDVD 10 and removed in PowerDVD 20.
 Blu-Ray disc playback: added in PowerDVD 6.
 TrueTheater®: PowerDVD adds TrueTheater® image/color correction and enhancement, also motion enhancement to make motion smoother. TrueTheater® HDR enhancement provides a larger color space.
 Media Casting to Streaming Devices: supported devices as Roku®, Chromecast™, and Apple TV®.

Version history

Decoders

Native video decoders
 H.264/MPEG-4 AVC (including MVC for Blu-ray-3D)
 H.265/MPEG-H HEVC (Media File Type)
 MPEG-4 ASP (DivX, Xvid)
 MPEG-2/HD
 MPEG-1
 VC-1
 WMV HD

Native audio decoders
 Dolby Meridian Lossless Packing (MLP)
 Dolby TrueHD (7.1 Channel)
 Dolby Digital Plus (7.1 Channel)
 Dolby Digital EX (7.1 Channel)
 Dolby Digital (2 & 5.1 Channel)
 DSD (In PowerDVD 16)
 DTS-HD (7.1 Channel)
 DTS-ES (Discrete & Matrix)
 DTS 96/24 Decoding
 DTS (5.1 Channel)
 LPCM
 AAC
 MP3 Surround
 MP2

Audio effects
 Dolby Pro Logic IIx Surround Sound
 Dolby Virtual Speaker
 CyberLink TrueTheater Surround

See also
Comparison of video player software

References

External links
 

1998 software
Software Blu-ray players
Windows media players